The Wharton Baronetcy, of Kirby Kendall in the County of Westmorland, was a title in the Baronetage of England. It was created on 19 December 1677 for the Royalist soldier and astrologer George Wharton. The title became extinct on the death of the second Baronet sometime before 1741.

Wharton baronets, of Kirby Kendall (1677)

Sir George Wharton, 1st Baronet (1617–1681)
Sir Polycarpus Wharton, 2nd Baronet (-by 1741)

References

Extinct baronetcies in the Baronetage of England